Astrid Scheel Rosing Sawyer (15 May 1874 – January 31, 1954) was a Danish-born businesswoman and translator.

Early life 
Astrid Scheel Rosing was from Copenhagen, Denmark, the daughter of Ulrik Rosing and Anna Gustien. She emigrated to the United States as a girl in 1888, with her siblings and their widowed mother.

Career 

In her teens, hoping to earn money for singing lessons, Rosing worked as a stenographer and typist at a building materials company in Chicago. In time, she learned the business, and formed the Astrid S. Rosing Inc., a successful building materials dealer. She owned a fleet of motor trucks (still a novelty in 1915 Chicago) and several warehouses and supply yards. "Men told me it was no business for a woman," she recalled later. "No, that didn't discourage me and I never for a minute had any notion of giving up." She spoke to the Illinois Clay Manufacturers' Association convention in 1917. 

She also translated Hjalmar Meidell's Henry VIII and Catherine Howard from Norwegian to English. 

Sawyer was also co-founder and vice-president of the Chicago Equestrian Association.

Personal life 
Astrid Rosing married American engineer, Walter Percy Sawyer, in 1918, in Chicago. He worked at Astrid S. Rosing, Inc. "Never leave your work to find yourself a husband," she advised. "Let him find you." They had a daughter, Helen Marion Sawyer. Astrid Rosing Sawyer died in 1954, aged 79 years, in Illinois.

References 

1874 births
1954 deaths
People from Copenhagen
American translators
20th-century Danish businesswomen
20th-century Danish businesspeople
Danish emigrants to the United States